Galera may refer to:

Places
 Careiae, ancient city in Italy afterward called Galera
 Galera railway station, in Peru, the highest railway station in the Western Hemisphere
 Galera, Granada, a municipality in the province of Granada in Spain
 Puerto Galera, a municipality in the province of Oriental Mindoro in the Philippines
 Galera River, in Mato Grosso state in western Brazil

People 
 Federico Galera Díez (b. 1978), Spanish athlete

Other
 Galera (song), a 2011 single by Jessy Matador
Galera, a synonym of Epipogium, an orchid genus
 Galera cluster, a generic synchronous multi-master replication library for transactional databases, used in MySQL and MariaDB; see multi-master replication#MySQL / MariaDB
Galera is the Spanish for galley, a type of sailing ship